Nabón Canton is a canton of Ecuador, located in the Azuay Province.  Its capital is the town of Nabón.  Its population at the 2001 census was 15,121.

Demographics
Ethnic groups as of the Ecuadorian census of 2010:
Mestizo  66.5%
Indigenous  31.7%
White  0.9%
Afro-Ecuadorian  0.7%
Montubio  0.1%
Other  0.1%

References

Cantons of Azuay Province